Herbert Pope Stothart (September 11, 1885February 1, 1949) was an American songwriter, arranger, conductor, and composer. He was also nominated for twelve Academy Awards, winning Best Original Score for The Wizard of Oz.  Stothart was widely acknowledged as a member of the top tier of Hollywood composers during the 1930s and 1940s.

Life and career
Herbert Stothart was born in Milwaukee, Wisconsin. He studied music in Europe and at the University of Wisconsin–Madison, where he later taught.

Stothart was first hired by producer Arthur Hammerstein to be a musical director for touring companies of Broadway shows, and was soon writing music for the producer's nephew Oscar Hammerstein II.  He composed music for the famous operetta, Rose-Marie. Stothart soon joined with many famous composers including Vincent Youmans, George Gershwin and Franz Lehár. Stothart achieved pop-chart success with standards like “Cute Little Two by Four”, “Wildflower”, “Bambalina”, “The Mounties”, “Totem Tom-Tom”, “Why Shouldn’t We?”, “Fly Away”, “Song of the Flame”, “The Cossack Love Song”, “Dawn”, “I Wanna Be Loved by You”, “Cuban Love Song”, “The Rogue Song” and “The Donkey Serenade.”

The year 1929 marked the end of the era of silent films. Shortly after completing his latest musical Golden Dawn with Emmerich Kálmán, Oscar Hammerstein, and Otto Harbach, Stothart received an invitation from Louis B. Mayer to move to Hollywood, which he accepted. In 1929, Stothart was signed to a large MGM contract.

The next twenty years of his life were spent at MGM Studios, where he was part of elite group of Hollywood composers. Among the many films that he worked on was the famous 1936 version of Rose-Marie, starring Jeanette MacDonald and Nelson Eddy. He conducted and wrote songs and scores for the films The Cuban Love Song, The Good Earth, Romeo and Juliet, Mutiny on the Bounty, Mrs. Miniver, The Green Years and The Picture of Dorian Gray. His output included the Marx Brothers' Night at the Opera, the Leo Tolstoy romantic drama Anna Karenina, two Charles Dickens dramas (A Tale of Two Cities and David Copperfield), and Mutiny on the Bounty, which earned him his first Academy Award nomination. He won an Oscar for his musical score for the 1939 film The Wizard of Oz.

Herbert Stothart spent his entire Hollywood career at MGM. In 1947, he suffered a heart attack while visiting Scotland, and afterwards, composed an orchestral piece (Heart Attack: A Symphonic Poem), based on his tribulations. He worked on another (Voices of Liberation), commissioned by Roger Wagner Chorale, when he died two years later at the age of 63.

Awards 
Stothart received 12 Academy Award nominations and won the Academy Award for Best Original Score for The Wizard of Oz.
 1939 Best Music, Scoring a Dramatic or Comedy Film – The Wizard of Oz

Academy Award Nominations:
 1935 Best Music, Scoring a Dramatic or Comedy Film – Mutiny on the Bounty
 1937 Best Music, Scoring a Dramatic or Comedy Film – Maytime
 1938 Best Music, Scoring a Dramatic or Comedy Film – Marie Antoinette
 1938 Best Music, Scoring a Dramatic or Comedy Film – Sweethearts
 1940 Best Music, Scoring a Dramatic or Comedy Film – Waterloo Bridge
 1941 Best Music, Scoring a Musical Picture – The Chocolate Soldier
 1942 Best Music, Scoring a Dramatic or Comedy Film – Random Harvest
 1943 Best Music, Scoring a Dramatic or Comedy Film – Thousands Cheer
 1943 Best Music, Scoring a Dramatic or Comedy Film – Madame Curie
 1944 Best Music, Scoring a Dramatic or Comedy Film – Kismet
 1945 Best Music, Scoring a Dramatic or Comedy Film – The Valley of Decision

Works
Herbert Stothart's movie scores include:

Devil-May-Care (1929)
Rasputin and the Empress (1932)
Queen Christina (1933)
The Barretts of Wimpole Street (1934)
What Every Woman Knows (1934)
Anna Karenina (1935)
China Seas (1935)
David Copperfield (1935 version)
 Mutiny on the Bounty (1935)
Naughty Marietta (musical score only; the songs were by Victor Herbert, Rida Johnson Young, and Gus Kahn) (1935)
A Night at the Opera (1935, which also used music by Giuseppe Verdi, Ruggero Leoncavallo, and Nacio Herb Brown, with some lyrics by Arthur Freed)
A Tale of Two Cities (1935)
After the Thin Man (1936)
The Good Earth (1937)
Marie Antoinette (1938)
Idiot's Delight (1939)
The Wizard of Oz (Oscar: Best Original Score; songs by E.Y. Harburg and Harold Arlen)
Northwest Passage (1940 film by King Vidor)
Pride and Prejudice (1940 version)
Come Live With Me (1941)
Blossoms in the Dust (additional uncredited music by Daniele Amfitheatrof) (1941)
Mrs. Miniver (additional uncredited music by Daniele Amfitheatrof) (1942)
I Married An Angel (1942)
Random Harvest (1942)
The Human Comedy (1943) 
Madame Curie (1943)
National Velvet (1944)
Thirty Seconds Over Tokyo (1944)
Dragon Seed (1944)
The White Cliffs of Dover (1944)
The Picture of Dorian Gray (additional uncredited music by Mario Castelnuovo-Tedesco (1945)
They Were Expendable  (1945 World War II film by John Ford) (1945)
The Green Years (1946)
The Yearling (arrangement of Frederick Delius's music) (1946)
The Sea of Grass (1947)

Death 
Herbert Stothart died of cancer in Los Angeles, California at the age of 63. He is interred at Glendale's Forest Lawn Memorial Park Cemetery.

References

External links
 

Information on Herbert Stothart

New York Times
Herbert Stothart at Songwriters Hall of Fame
 Herbert Stothart recordings at the Discography of American Historical Recordings.

1885 births
1949 deaths
American musical theatre composers
American film score composers
Broadway composers and lyricists
Broadway music directors
American male film score composers
Best Original Music Score Academy Award winners
University of Wisconsin–Madison alumni
Burials at Forest Lawn Memorial Park (Glendale)
20th-century American male musicians